Exosome component 5, also known as EXOSC5, is a human gene, which is part of the exosome complex.

Biallelic pathogenic variation in EXOSC5 causes autosomal recessive cerebellar ataxia, brain abnormalities, and cardiac conduction defects (CABAC, MIM 619576). Individuals with CABAC often have delayed developmental milestones, intellectual disability, cerebellar ataxia, hypotonia, dysarthria, and dysmorphic facies. Cardiac abnormalities including conduction defects, right bundle branch block, sinus node dysfunction, intraventricular conduction delay, atrioventricular block, and/or ventricular tachycardia. Cardiac pacemakers and defibrillators have been needed, and sudden cardiac death has been reported.

Interactions 

Exosome component 5 has been shown to interact with:
 Exosome component 1, and
 Exosome component 8.

References

Further reading